Brennik may refer to the following places in Poland:
Brennik in Gmina Złotoryja, Złotoryja County in Lower Silesian Voivodeship (SW Poland)
Other places called Brennik (listed in Polish Wikipedia)